Anna Bocson (née Wojtaszek, divorced Pazera; born 25 November 1936) is a Poland-born Australian retired athlete who specialised in the javelin throw.

She competed for Poland at the 1956 Olympic Games in Melbourne and finished ninth. After the Games, she emigrated to South Australia, becoming Anna Pazera through marriage. She then represented Australia at the 1958 British Empire and Commonwealth Games in Cardiff and won a gold medal with a throw of 57.40 metres, breaking Dana Zátopková's world record by a metre and a half. Her best Olympic performance was in 1960, when she placed sixth in the final of the Rome Games.

Remarried and known as Anna Bocson for the latter part of her career, she retired from sport after the 1968 Australian Championships.

See also
 List of Australian athletics champions (women)

References
 Anna Bocson (Wojtaszek/Pazera) at Australian Athletics Historical Results
 

1936 births
Living people
People from Racibórz County
Sportspeople from Silesian Voivodeship
Polish female javelin throwers
Australian female javelin throwers
Olympic athletes of Poland
Olympic athletes of Australia
Athletes (track and field) at the 1956 Summer Olympics
Athletes (track and field) at the 1960 Summer Olympics
Athletes (track and field) at the 1964 Summer Olympics
Commonwealth Games gold medallists for Australia
Commonwealth Games medallists in athletics
Athletes (track and field) at the 1958 British Empire and Commonwealth Games
Athletes (track and field) at the 1962 British Empire and Commonwealth Games
Athletes (track and field) at the 1966 British Empire and Commonwealth Games
World record setters in athletics (track and field)
Polish emigrants to Australia
Medallists at the 1958 British Empire and Commonwealth Games
Medallists at the 1962 British Empire and Commonwealth Games
Medallists at the 1966 British Empire and Commonwealth Games